Tracy Carol Joseph (née Goddard, born 29 November 1969) is a British former athlete who competed in the 400 metres and long jump. She won a bronze medal 4 × 400 metres relay at the 1993 World Championships representing Great Britain, and a gold medal in the 4 × 400 metres relay at the 1994 Commonwealth Games representing England. She was also a member of the British quartet that won at the 1994 European Cup.

Career
In 1991, Goddard came second behind Sandra Leigh in the 400 metres event at the 1991 UK Athletics Championships. Goddard competed at the 1993 World Championships in Athletics in Stuttgart, winning a bronze medal in the 4 × 400 metres relay, competing with Linda Keough, Phylis Smith and Sally Gunnell. She was in the England team that won the 4 x 400 metres relay at the 1994 Commonwealth Games in Victoria, along with Keough, Smith and Gunnell, after the Australian team were disqualified. Joseph came third in the long jump event at the 1997 British Athletics Championships, and fifth in the long jump event at the 1998 Commonwealth Games.

International competitions

References

External links

1969 births
Living people
British female sprinters
British female long jumpers
English female sprinters
English female long jumpers
Commonwealth Games medallists in athletics
Commonwealth Games gold medallists for England
Athletes (track and field) at the 1994 Commonwealth Games
World Athletics Championships athletes for Great Britain
World Athletics Championships medalists
Medallists at the 1994 Commonwealth Games